Cheating Hitler: Surviving the Holocaust is a Canadian television documentary film directed by Rebecca Snow, which premiered in 2019 on History. The film focuses on Helen Yermus, Maxwell Smart and Rose Lipsyzc, three Jewish Canadians who survived the Holocaust as children, as they share their stories and explore unresolved questions from their histories in conjunction with historians, genealogists and forensic experts.

The film aired on History on November 11, 2019, and was rebroadcast on November 16 by the Global Television Network.

The film received a Banff Rockie Award nomination for Best History and Biography Documentary at the 2020 Banff World Media Festival. It received six Canadian Screen Award nominations at the 9th Canadian Screen Awards in 2021, for Best History Program or Series, Best Editorial Research (Natasza Niedzielska, Heather Kohlmann, Steve Gamester, Rebecca Snow, Naomi Wise), Best Visual Research (Elizabeth Klinck, Elspeth Domville, Monica Penner), Best Photography in a Documentary Program or Factual Series (Mark Caswell, Alysha Galbreath), Best Direction in a Documentary (Rebecca Snow) and Best Writing in a Documentary (Rebecca Snow). It won the award for Best Visual Research.

References

External links

2019 films
2019 documentary films
2019 television films
Canadian documentary television films
History (Canadian TV network) original programming
Jewish Canadian films
Documentary films about the Holocaust
2010s Canadian films